Sloboda is a Slovak surname. In Slavic languages the primary meaning of the word is "freedom", "liberty". As the surname it used to refer to "free men" (to distinguish them from "serfs"). The cognate surnames in other Slavic languages include Svoboda and Swoboda.

The surname may refer to:

Anton Sloboda, Slovak footballer
John Sloboda, British cognitive psychologist
Karol Sloboda, Slovak professional ice hockey player
Martin Sloboda, Slovak professional ice hockey player
Radoslav Sloboda, Slovak professional ice hockey player
Radovan Sloboda (ice hockey), Slovak professional ice hockey player
Radovan Sloboda (politician), Slovak politician and sports administrator
Roman Sloboda, Slovak footballer
Rudolf Sloboda (1938–1995), Slovak author

References

See also
 

Slovak-language surnames